The following outline is provided as an overview of and topical guide to automobiles:

Automobile (or car) – wheeled passenger vehicle that carries its own motor.  Most definitions of the term specify that automobiles are designed to run primarily on roads, to have seating for one to six people, typically have four wheels, and be constructed principally for the transport of people rather than goods.  As of 2002 there were 590 million passenger cars worldwide (roughly one car for every eleven people), of which 140 million were in the U.S. (roughly one car for every two people).

Types of automobile
The basic automobile is privately owned for transporting the owner and his or her passengers.  See automobile.  Other types of cars include:
 Alternative fuel vehicle
 Armored car
 Battery vehicle (electric car)
 Police car
 Solar vehicle
 Taxicab

By car body style 

 By size
 City car
 Compact car
 Full-size car
 Kei car
 Large family car
 Microcar
 Mid-size car
 Supermini
 Voiturette
 By body style
 Convertible
 Cabrio coach
 Drophead coupe
 Retractable hardtop
 Roadster
 Targa top
 T-top
 Coupé
 Quad coupé
 Crossover SUV
 Fastback
 Hardtop
 Hatchback
 Liftback
 Limousine
 Minivan
 Notchback
 Pickup truck
 Coupé utility
 Ute
 Sedan (Saloon)
 Shooting-brake
 Sport utility vehicle
 Station wagon
 Touring car
 Town car
 Van
 Leisure activity vehicle
 Panel van
 Tow truck
 Other car types
 2 plus 2
 Antique car
 Classic car
 Custom car
 Luxury vehicle
 Compact executive car
 Executive car
 Personal luxury car
 Sports car
 Grand tourer
 Hot hatch
 Hot rod
 Muscle car
 Pony car
 Sport compact
 Supercar
 Taxicab

Specialized vehicles 
 Amphibious vehicle
 Driverless car
 Flying car
 Gyrocar

By propulsion system 

 Internal combustion engine
 Electric vehicle
 Battery electric vehicle
 Neighborhood Electric Vehicle
 Hybrid vehicle
 Plug-in hybrid
 Plug-in electric vehicle
 Hydrogen vehicle
 Fuel cell
 Steam car
 Alternative fuel vehicle
 Autogas
 Biodiesel
 Common ethanol fuel mixtures
 Flexible-fuel vehicle
 Gasoline Direct Injection
 Homogeneous Charge Compression Ignition
 Liquid Nitrogen

By engine

By engine type 
 Engine configuration (IC engines only)
 Flat engine
 Flathead engine
 Four-stroke engine
 H engine
 Pushrod engine
 Reciprocating engine
 Single-cylinder engine
 Straight engine
 Straight-six engine
 Two-stroke engine
 V engine
 W engine
 Wankel engine

By engine fuel type 
 Engine fuel type
 Diesel engine
 Electric car
 Gasoline engine
 Hybrid vehicle
 Hydrogen vehicle
 Steam car

By engine positioning 
 Engine positioning
 Front-engine
 Rear-engine
 Mid-engine

By drive type 
 Drive wheels
 Two-wheel-drive
 Four-wheel-drive
 Front-wheel-drive
 Rear-wheel-drive

By layout 
 Layout
 Front-engine, front-wheel-drive
 Rear-engine, front-wheel-drive
 Front-engine, rear-wheel-drive
 Front mid-engine, rear-wheel-drive
 Rear mid-engine, rear-wheel-drive
 Mid-engine, front-wheel-drive
 Rear-engine, rear-wheel-drive

Automotive design 

 Automotive design
 Body
 Framework
 Automobile platform
 Body-on-frame
 Bumper
 Cabrio coach
 Chassis
 Continental tire
 Crumple zone
 Dagmar bumpers
 Decklid
 Fender
 Fender skirts
 Grille (architecture)
 Hood
 Hood scoop
 Monocoque
 Overhang
 Pillar
 Ponton (automobile)
 Pontoon fenders
 Quarter panel
 Shaker scoop
 Spoiler
 Subframe
 Tonneau
 Compartments
 Trunk/Boot/Dickie
 Hood/Bonnet
 Doors
 Butterfly doors
 Canopy door
 Gull-wing door
 Scissor doors
 Sliding doors
 Suicide door
 Glass
 Greenhouse
 Power window
 Quarter glass
 Sunroof
 Windshield/Windscreen
 Windshield/Windscreen wiper
 Other
 Bumper sticker
 Curb feeler
 Hood ornament
 Japan Black paint
 Monsoonshield
 Nerf bar
 Tire/Tyre
 Tow hitch
 Truck accessory
 Lighting
 Daytime running lamp
 Headlamp
 Hidden headlamps
 High-intensity discharge lamps
 Retroreflector
 Sealed beam
 Trafficators
 Legal and other
 Motor vehicle theft
 Parking sensors
 Vanity plate
 Vehicle Identification Number
 Vehicle registration plate
 Vehicle horn Windshield/Windscreen washer fluid
 Wing mirror
 Interior equipment
 Instruments
 Backup camera
 Boost gauge
 Buzzer
 Carputer
 Electronic instrument cluster
 Fuel gauge
 Global Positioning System and Automotive navigation system
 Head-up display
 Idiot light
 Malfunction Indicator Lamp
 Night vision
 Odometer
 Radar detector
 LIDAR detector
 Speedometer
 Tachometer
 Trip computer
 Controls
 Bowden cable
 Cruise control
 Electronic throttle control
 Gear stick
 Hand brake
 Manettino dial
 Steering wheel
 Throttle
 Brake
 Theft deterrence
 Automatic vehicle location
 Car alarm
 Immobiliser
 Power door locks
 VIN etching
 Safety & seating
 Airbag
 Armrest
 Automatic seat belts
 Bench seat
 Bucket seat
 Child safety lock
 Rumble seat
 Seat belt
 Other
 Air conditioning
 Automobile accessory power
 Car audio
 Car phone
 Center console
 Dashboard
 Flat tire
 Glove compartment
 RF connector
 Power steering
 Rear-view mirror
 Smart key
 Sun visor
 Trap (secret compartment)

History of automobiles

History of the automobile
 History of steam road vehicles
 Cugnot's fardier à vapeur – an experimental steam-driven artillery tractor regarded by some as the first 'car'
 Benz Patent Motorwagen – First purpose-built automobile

General automobile concepts

 Driving
 Defensive driving
 Energy-efficient driving
 Vehicle dynamics
 Understeer and oversteer
 Weight transfer
 Road traffic safety
 Safety barrier
 Automobile safety
 Active safety
 Crash test
 Crash test dummy
 Crashworthiness
 Side collision
 Vehicle rollover
 Traffic collision
 Automobile safety rating

Auto parts and systems

 Car engine
 Basic terminology
 Bore
 Compression ratio
 Crank
 Cylinder
 Dead centre
 Diesel engine
 Dry sump
 Engine balance
 Engine configuration
 Engine displacement
 Engine knocking
 Firing order
 Hydrolock
 Petrol engine
 Power band
 Redline
 Spark-ignition engine
 Stroke
 Stroke ratio
 Wet sump
 Main components
 Connecting rod
 Crankcase
 Crankpin
 Crankshaft
 Crossflow cylinder head
 Crossplane
 Cylinder bank
 Cylinder block
 Cylinder head
 Flywheel
 Head gasket
 Hypereutectic piston
 Main bearing
 Piston
 Piston ring
 Reverse-flow cylinder head
 Starter ring gear
 Sump
 Valvetrain
 Cam
 Cam follower
 Camshaft
 Desmodromic valve
 Hydraulic tappet
 Multi-valve
 Overhead camshaft
 Overhead valve
 Pneumatic valve springs
 Poppet valve
 Pushrod
 Rocker arm
 Sleeve valve
 Tappet
 Timing belt
 Timing mark
 Valve float
 Variable valve timing
 Aspiration
 Air filter
 Blowoff valve
 Boost controller
 Butterfly valve
 Centrifugal type supercharger
 Cold air intake
 Dump valve
 Electronic throttle control
 Forced induction
 Inlet manifold
 Intake
 Intercooler
 Manifold vacuum
 Naturally aspirated engine
 Ram-air intake
 Scroll-type supercharger
 Short ram air intake
 Supercharger
 Throttle
 Throttle body
 Turbocharger
 Twin-turbo
 Variable geometry turbocharger
 Variable length intake manifold
 Warm air intake
 Fuel system
 Carburetor
 Common rail
 Direct injection
 Fuel filter
 Fuel injection
 Fuel pump
 Fuel tank
 Gasoline direct injection
 Indirect injection
 Injection pump
 Lean burn
 Unit Injector
 Electrics, ignition andengine management
 Air-fuel ratio meter
 Alternator
 Automatic Performance Control
 Car battery
 Contact breaker
 Crank sensor
 Distributor
 Dynamo
 Drive by wire
 Electrical ballast
 Electronic control unit
 Engine control unit
 Glow plug
 High tension leads
 Ignition coil
 Lead–acid battery
 Ignition magneto
 Mass flow sensor
 Oxygen sensor
 Spark plug
 Starter motor
 Exhaust system
 Automobile emissions control
 Catalytic converter
 Diesel particulate filter
 Exhaust manifold
 Glasspack
 Muffler
 Engine cooling
 Air cooling
 Antifreeze
 Core plug
 Electric fan
 Ethylene glycol
 Fan belt
 Radiator
 Thermostat
 Water cooling
 Viscous fan
 Other components
 Balance shaft
 Block heater
 Combustion chamber
 Cylinder head porting
 Gasket
 Motor oil
 Oil filter
 Oil pump
 Oil sludge
 PCV valve
 Seal
 Synthetic oil
 Underdrive pulleys
 Powertrain
 Hybrid powertrains
 Hybrid vehicle drivetrain
 Transmission
 Automatic transmission
 Clutch
 Continuously variable transmission
 Differential
 Drive shaft
 Dual-clutch transmission
 Automated manual transmission
 Electrorheological clutch
 Epicyclic gearing
 Fluid coupling
 Gear stick
 Limited-slip differential
 Locking differential
 Manual transmission
 Manumatic
 Parking pawl
 Semi-automatic transmission
 Torque converter
 Transaxle
 Transmission control unit
 Universal joint
 Suspension
 Anti-roll bar (sway bar)
 Axle
 Axle track
 Beam axle
 Camber angle
 Car handling
 Coil spring
 De Dion tube
 Double-wishbone
 Hydragas
 Hydrolastic
 Hydropneumatic
 Independent suspension
 Leaf spring
 Live axle
 MacPherson strut
 Multi-link suspension
 Panhard rod
 Shock absorber
 Swing axle
 Toe angle
 Torsion bar
 Trailing arm
 Unsprung mass
 Watt's linkageWheel alignment
 Wheelbase
 Steering
 Ackermann steering geometry
 Caster angle
 Kingpin
 Oversteer
 Power steering
 Rack and pinion
 Torque steering
 Understeer
 Brakes
 Automatic Braking
 Anti-lock Braking System (ABS)
 Brake bleeding
 Brake fade
 Brake fluid
 Brake lining
 Disc brake
 Drum brake
 Electronic Brakeforce Distribution
 Electronic Stability Control
 Engine braking
 Hydraulic brake
 Hydraulic fluid
 Inboard brake
 Parking brake
 Regenerative brake
 Vacuum servo
 Roadwheels and tires (tyres)
 Outline of tires
 Alloy wheel
 Custom wheel
 Drive wheel
 Hubcap
 Rostyle wheel
 Spinner
 Wire wheels
 Automobile safety technology
 Airbag
 Anti-lock braking system
 Crumple zone
 Collision avoidance system
 Emergency brake assist
 Electronic stability control
 Traction control system
 Seat belt

See also

CarDomain (an online community site for car enthusiasts)
Outline of bicycles

 Automobile lists

 Lists of automobiles
 List of auto parts
 List of automobiles by sales
 List of countries by automobile production
 List of car brands
 List of automobile manufacturers
 List of solar car teams
 List of military armoured cars
 List of sports car manufacturers

External links

Fédération Internationale de l'Automobile

Automobile
Automobile
automobiles